This is a list of mountains in the U.S. state of South Dakota.

Sources
 Elevations and Distances in the United States - Elevations on Selected Summits East of the Rocky Mountains (United States Geological Survey)
 Official South Dakota Highway Map. State of South Dakota. 2007.
 A Tourist Guide of the Black Hills (South Dakota Department of Environment & Natural Resources)

 

South Dakota geography-related lists

South Dakota